Seaboard World Airlines was an international all-cargo airline based in the United States. Its headquarters were on the grounds of John F. Kennedy International Airport in New York City.

History 

Seaboard World Airlines was founded on September 16, 1946, as Seaboard & Western Airlines. It initially operated Douglas DC-4 aircraft, followed by Lockheed Super Constellation airliners. It adopted the name Seaboard World Airlines in April 1961. Jet cargo service started in 1964 with the introduction of the Douglas DC-8.

The airline played a prominent role in the Vietnam War during the late 1960s, using Douglas DC-8-63 jets to connect McChord Air Force Base, Washington with Cam Ranh Bay, Vietnam. In 1968, one of these flights operating as Seaboard World Airlines Flight 253A was forced to land in the Soviet Union with 214 American troops on board.  On 30 April 1969, a Seaboard World Airlines DC-8 with 219 passengers and 13 crewmembers landed by mistake at Marble Mountain Air Facility, when it had actually been cleared to land at the nearby Da Nang Air Base.  After fuel and passengers were offloaded, the plane was towed to the north overrun and departed five hours after the landing incident.

Seaboard was the first airline to fly a 747 Freighter service from the UK to the USA.

The airline merged with Flying Tiger Line on October 1, 1980, resulting in the loss of its corporate identity.

It is now part of FedEx Airlines.

Fleet

See also 
 List of defunct airlines of the United States

References

External links

Seaboard Historical Website
Timetable Images
Seaboard World Airlines aircraft
Incident/Accident
DC-8 at Marble Mountain
Seaboard World Airlines Collection

 
Defunct airlines of the United States
Defunct cargo airlines
Airlines established in 1946
Airlines disestablished in 1980
1946 establishments in New York City
Central Intelligence Agency front organizations